Red deer antler headdresses (or red deer antler caps) were modified red deer skulls, including the antlers that may have been used as a head-dress. They are often believed to be the oldest traces of shamanic and religious behaviour. Two of the small number of head-dresses currently known were discovered during archaeological excavations at the Mesolithic site of Bedburg-Königshoven (North Rhine-Westphalia, Germany).

Location and history of research

The Mesolithic site of Bedburg-Königshoven was located in the vicinity of the former village of Morken, some 5,6 km southwest of Grevenbroich and 21 km southeast of Mönchengladbach in western Germany. Morken was destroyed during the course of lignite mining between the 1960s and 1970s.

During the Preboreal a Mesolithic archaeological site was located directly on the shore of a “dead arm” the Erft river. The centre of the archaeological site was destroyed by a mechanical digger during mining before archaeologists began their work in 1987. Thus, only 370m² of the shallow water area were excavated and analysed by archaeologists of Monrepos Archaeological Research Centre. The site was initially discovered by members of a survey team of the Geographical Institute of the University of Düsseldorf, who had encountered animal bones dating to the last ice age.

As part of an archaeological follow-up survey, archaeologists from Monrepos discovered the skull of a red deer with obvious traces of human modification. This find and the generally good state of preservation at the site led to further excavations. 
In addition to Early Mesolithic stone tools and two red deer head-dresses, well-preserved bones of red deer, roe deer, aurochs, dogs and different species of birds and fish were also found in what is described as a discard area. During the Mesolithic these items had been discarded as refuse into the shallow water. Analysis of the faunal remains and the nutrition of the Mesolithic hunter-gatherers by Martin Street of Monrepos resulted in new insights into human behaviour at the beginning of the current warm stage, the Holocene.

Description of the antler caps
Each specimen belongs to the cranium of a red deer that includes parts of the nasal, frontal, parietal, temporal and occipital bone. Cap 1 is that of a royal stag, whilst cap 2 is that of an imperial stag. Both head-dresses show two lateral perforations, 1–2 cm in diameter.

Comparison with other finds
There are not more than a handful of sites with related findings. Antler caps are also known from the Early Mesolithic sites of Hohen Viecheln, Star Carr, Berlin-Biesdorf and Plau. Most of the antler caps from these sites were treated in a different manner. Existing perforations are located on the parietal bone (Hohen Viecheln, Star Carr). In most cases the antlers were shortened (Hohen Viecheln, Plau, Star Carr), thinned (Berlin-Biesdorf, Hohen Viecheln, Plau, Star Carr) or gouged (Berlin-Biesdorf, Star Carr), thus keeping their “antler-look” whilst losing much of their weight.

Age determination
The caps from Bedburg-Königshoven were found in fluviatile sediments, which, based on palynological evidence, are thought to date into the Preboreal. This assumption is further supporter by the lithic typology occurring at the site, the faunal composition and two radiocarbon charcoal samples (KN-3998, KN3999) which place the archaeological horizon into a window of 9780±100 and 9600±100 BP[2] radiocarbon years.

Interpretation and implications
A common interpretation of the head-dresses is that they were used as a disguise during the hunt or as part of the shamanic garb. Both interpretations where posited by the excavator of the first so-called head-dresses, Sir Grahame Clark. Clark posited that because the antlers were "lightened" and because bony inequalities and protuberances were removed or smoothed, it was more likely that they had been worn as a head dress, rather than serving as stationary items.

Up to the present day, antler caps as a find category lack well-founded analysis. The scholarly discussion has not developed beyond a debate about ethnological and ethnographical comparisons. The immediate result of the lack of research is that the implications of modified head-dresses can only be discussed in theoretical approaches.

Since the appearance of modern humans in Europe approximately 40,000 years ago, hybrid creations, half human – half animal, and the increasing importance of red deer antlers as signs show the special meaning of metamorphosed head-dresses for the hunter-gatherers throughout the Upper Palaeolithic and Mesolithic periods. Exemplary for this is the Lion Man of the Hohlenstein-Stadel (Germany) and the “sorcerer” on a wall in the Cave of the Trois-Frères (France). Another sign for a religious interpretation of the find category is the drawing of a Siberian shaman wearing a red deer antler head-dress, which was painted on account of Nicolaes Witsen’s travel to Siberia during the late 17th century.

On-going research about the red deer antler headdresses from Bedburg-Königshoven is currently proceeding at Monrepos. Analyses are focusing on the functional background, modifications and use-wear, thus providing new approaches for the interpretation of hunter-gatherer antler head-dresses and more importantly the social regulations and conventions of hunter-gatherer societies.

Literature

 Clark, J. G. D. Excavations at Star Carr. An early Mesolithic site at Seamer near Scarborough, Yorkshire. Cambridge 1954.
 Street, M. 1989. Jäger und Schamanen. Bedburg-Königshoven : ein Wohnplatz am Niederrhein vor 10000 Jahren. Mainz.
 Street, M. 1991. Bedburg-Königshoven: A Pre-Boreal Mesolithic site in the Lower Rhineland, Germany. In: N Barton, A J Roberts and D ARoe (eds.). The Late Glacial in north-west Europe: Human adaptation and environmental change at the end of the Pleistocene. CBA Research Report 77. 1991.
 Street, M. 1999. Remains of aurochs (Bos primigenius) from the early Mesolithic site Bedburg-Königshoven (Rhineland, Germany). Wissenschaftliche Schriften des Neandertal Museums(1): pp. 173–194. Proceedings of the First Neanderthal Conference, Mettmann 25.-26. October, 1997.
 Behling, H and Street, M. 1999. Palaeoecological studies at the Mesolithic site at Bedburg-Königshoven near Cologne, Germany. Veget Hist Archaeobot (8): 273–285.
 Conneller, C. 2004. Becoming deer: corporeal transformations at Star Carr. Archaeological Dialogues (11): 37–56.
 Gaudzinski-Windheuser, S. and Jöris, O. 2006. 600.000 Jahre Menschheitsgeschichte. Begleitbuch zur Ausstellung im Museum für die Archäologie des Eiszeitalters, Schloss Monrepos, Neuwied. Mainz. pp. 68–71.

References

Archaeological sites in Germany